Damietta is a port city and the capital of the Damietta Governorate in Egypt, a former bishopric and present multiple Catholic titular see. Damietta joined the UNESCO Global Network of Learning Cities.

Etymology 
The modern name of the town comes from its Coptic name Tamiati, which in turn most likely comes from Ancient Egyptian  ("harbour, port"), although al-Maqrizi suggested a Syriac etymology.

History 
Mentioned by the 6th-century geographer Stephanus Byzantius, it was called Tamiathis in the Hellenistic period.

Under Caliph Omar (579–644), the Arabs took the town and successfully resisted the attempts by the Byzantine Empire to recover it, especially in 739, 821, 921 and 968. The Abbasids used Alexandria, Damietta, Aden and Siraf as entry ports to India and the Tang Empire of China. Damietta was an important naval base during the Abbasid, Tulunid and Fatimid periods. This led to several attacks by the Byzantine Empire, most notably the sack and destruction of the city in May 853.

Damietta was again important in the 12th and 13th centuries during the time of the Crusades. In 1169, a fleet from the Kingdom of Jerusalem, with support from the Byzantine Empire, attacked the port, but the besiegers returned home without any success to capture the port, which was defended by Saladin.

During preparations for the Fifth Crusade in 1217, it was decided that Damietta should be the focus of attack. Control of Damietta meant control of the Nile, and from there the crusaders believed they would be able to conquer Egypt. From Egypt they could then attack Palestine and recapture Jerusalem. After the siege of Damietta of 1218–1219,  the port was occupied by the Crusaders. The siege devastated the population of Damietta. After the crusaders captured Damietta in November 1219 they looted the city. Earlier that year, Francis of Assisi had arrived to peaceably negotiate with the Muslim ruler. In 1221 the Crusaders attempted to march to Cairo, but were destroyed by the combination of nature and Muslim defenses.

Damietta was also the object of the Seventh Crusade, led by Louis IX of France. His fleet arrived there in 1249 and quickly captured the fort, which he refused to hand over to the nominal king of Jerusalem, to whom it had been promised during the Fifth Crusade. However, having been taken prisoner with his army in April 1250, Louis was obliged to surrender Damietta as ransom.

Hearing that Louis was preparing a new crusade, the Mamluk Sultan Baibars – in view of the importance of the town to the Crusaders – destroyed it in 1251 and rebuilt it with stronger fortifications a few kilometers from the river in the early 1260s, making the mouth of the Nile at Damietta impassable for ships.

Ecclesiastical history 
Hellenistic Tamiathis became a Christian bishopric, a suffragan of the metropolitan see of Pelusium, the capital of the Roman province of Augustamnica Prima, to which Tamiathis belonged. Its bishop Heraclius took part in the Council of Ephesus in 431. Helpidius was a signatory of the decree of Patriarch Gennadius of Constantinople against simony in 459. Bassus was at the Second Council of Constantinople (553). In a letter from Patriarch Michael I of Alexandria read at the Photian Council of Constantinople (879), mention is made of Zacharias of Tamiathis, who had attended a synod that Michael had convened in support of Photius. Later bishops too of Tamiathis are named in other documents.
 
In 1249, when Louis IX of France captured the town, it became for a short time the seat of a Latin Church bishop.
 
The Latin bishopric, no longer residential, is today listed by the Catholic Church twice as a titular see under the names Tamiathis (Latin) and Damiata (Curiate Italian), each at time of episcopal or archiepiscopal rank, of the Latin and Melkite Catholic Churches, for the Catholic Church, having been until the early 20th century an important centre for that church.

Titular Latin see 
The diocese was nominally restored in the 17th century when established as Latin titular archbishopric of Tamiathis of the Romans (Latin; Damiata in Curiate Italian) and had the following incumbents of the intermediary (archiepiscopal) rank :
 Bernardino Spada (later Cardinal) (1623.12.04 – 1626.01.19)
 Cardinal Cesare Facchinetti (1639.09.05 – 1672.11.14)
 Neri Corsini (later Cardinal) (1652.08.12 – 1664.01.14)
 Angelo Maria Ranuzzi (later Cardinal) (1668.04.30 – 1678.04.18)
 Ercole Visconti (1678.07.18 – ?)
 Marco Antonio Ansidei (later Cardinal) (1724.06.12 – 1726.12.16)
 Raffaele Cosimo De Girolami (later Cardinal) (1728.03.08 – 1743.09.09)
 Paul Alpheran de Bussan, Sovereign Military Order of Malta (O.B.E.) (1746.09.19 – 1757.04.20)
 Vincenzo Maria de Francisco e Galletti, Dominican Order (O.P.) (1757.12.19 – 1769.07.19)
 Bonaventura Prestandrea, Conventual Franciscans (O.F.M. Conv.) (1769.12.18 – 1777.12.21)
 Bartolomeo Pacca (later Cardinal) (1785.09.26 – 1801.02.23)
 Giovanni Francesco Compagnoni Marefoschi (1816.04.29 – 1820.09.17)
 Giovanni Giacomo Sinibaldi (1821.08.13 – 1843.01.27) (later Patriarch)*
 Vincenzo Gioacchino Pecci (later Pope Leo XIII) (1843.01.27 – 1846.01.19)
 Diego Planeta (1850.01.07 – 1858.06.05)
 Luigi Oreglia di Santo Stefano (later Cardinal) (1866.05.04 – 1873.12.22)
 Eugène-Louis-Marie Lion, O.P. (1874.03.13 – 1883.08.08)
 Eugenio Lachat, Missionaries of the Precious Blood (C.PP.S.) (1885.03.23 – 1886.11.01)
 Ignazio Persico (德斯馬曾), O.F.M. Cap. (later Cardinal) (1887.03.14 – 1893.01.16)
 Andrea Aiuti (later Cardinal) (1893.06.12 – 1903.06.22)
 Edoardo Carlo Gastone Pöttickh de Pettenegg, Teutonic Order (O.T.) (1904.11.14 – 1918.10.01)
 Sebastião Leite de Vasconcellos (1919.12.15 – 1923.01.29)
 Luigi Pellizzo (1923.03.24 – 1936.08.14)

Demoted in 1925 as Titular bishopric, it has been vacant for decades, having had the following incumbents, all of the episcopal (lowest) rank:
 Guglielmo Grassi (1937.01.13 – 1954.09.14)
 Eugenio Beitia Aldazabal (1954.10.30 – 1962.01.27)
 Marco Caliaro, Scalabrinians (C.S.) (1962.02.10 – 1962.05.23)
 Antonio Cece (1962.08.06 – 1966.03.31)

Titular Melkite see 
Established in 1900 as titular bishopric of Damiata of the Melkite Greeks (Italian; Latin Tamiathis), it was suppressed in 1935, after a single incumbent of this episcopal (lowest) rank:
 Titular Bishop Paul-Raphaël Abi-Mourad (1900.07.02 – 1935.08.08)

Restored in 1961 as Titular archbishopric, it has had the following incumbents of the archiepiscopal (intermediary) rank:
 Titular Archbishop Antonio Farage (1961.03.07 – 1963.11.09)
 Titular Archbishop Nicolas Hajj (1965.07.30 – 1984.11.03)
 Titular Archbishop Joseph Jules Zerey  (2001.06.22 – ... ), protosyncellus of Jerusalem of the Greek-Melkites (Palestine)

Climate 
Köppen-Geiger climate classification system classifies its climate as hot desert (BWh), but blowing winds from the Mediterranean Sea greatly moderate the temperatures, typical to the Egypt's north coast, making its summers moderately hot and humid while its winters mild and moderately wet where sleet and hail are also common.

Port Said, Kosseir, Ras El Bar, Baltim, Damietta and Alexandria have the least temperature variation in Egypt.

Economy 
Damietta is very famous for its furniture industry. In addition to the Egyptian market, its furniture is sold in Arab countries, Africa, Europe, US, and almost all over the world.
Today, there is a canal connecting it to the Nile, which has made it an important port once again. Containers are transported through the new Damietta Port. The Damietta governorate has a population of about 1,093,580 (2006). It contains the SEGAS LNG (Liquefied Natural Gas) plant, which will ultimately have a capacity of 9.6 million ton/year through two trains. The plant is owned by Segas, a joint venture of the Spanish utility Unión Fenosa (40%), Italian oil company Eni (40%) and the Egyptian companies EGAS and EGPC (10% each). The plant is unusual since it is not supplied from a dedicated field, but is supplied with gas from the Egyptian grid. ,  EMethanex, the Egyptian division of Methanex Corporation, a Canadian owned company, was building a 3600 MTPD methanol plant. Damietta also has a woodworking industry and is also noted for its White Domiati cheese and other dairy products and Pâtisserie and Egyptian desserts. It is also a fishing port.

Main sights 
Mosques
 Amr ibn al-A'as Mosque (al-Fateh), the second mosque to be built in Egypt and Africa by the Arabs after entering Egypt. It has been converted to a church twice during occupation by the crusaders. Louis IX of France's son, John Tristan, was baptized by a legate of the pope in this mosque.
 Al-Bahr Mosque, dating to the Ottoman rule era.
 Al-Hadidy Mosque in Faraskour, 200 years old.
 Al-Maainy Mosque, dating to the reign of al-Naser Mohammed ibn Qalawon.
 Al-Matbuly Mosque, dating to the Mamluk era.
 Al-Radwaniya Mosque, dating to the Mamluk era.

Other

 Tabiet Ahmed Urabi, ruins of Damietta Fort at Ezbet El-Borg.
 The Old Bridge, dating to the early 20th century.
 Souk al-Hesba, the old town centre, dating to the Abbasi rule era.

Notable people 

 Kamal al-Din Muhammad ibn Musa Al-Damiri, (1344–1405), writer on canon law and natural history
 Refaat Al-Gammal (Raafat el-Haggan), Egyptian spy
 Professor Aisha Abd al-Rahman (Bent Al Shatea), journalist and Muslim philosopher
 Latifa al-Zayyat, activist and writer
 Professor Abdel Rahman Badawi, professor of philosophy
 St. Sidhom Bishay, Coptic martyr
 Rifaat El-Fanagily, football player
 Mohamed Fahim ElGindy, who established and developed the furniture industry during 20th century in Damietta
 Rifaat el-Mahgoub, former Head of the Egyptian Parliament and a member of the ruling National Democratic Party
 Besheer El-Tabei, football player
 Mohammed Hassan El-Zayyat, former minister of foreign affairs.
 Farag Foda, secular writer shot to death in his office on 8 June 1992 by two Islamic fundamentalists from the Al-Gama'a al-Islamiyya group.
 Zahi Hawass, Egyptologist
 Yusuf Idris, writer and psychiatrist
 Zaki Naguib Mahmoud, writer and philosopher
 Ali Moustafa Mosharafa, physicist and contributor to the theory of relativity
 Farouk Shousha, poet; previously head of Egyptian Radio (El Soaraa village)
 Essam El Hadary, football player

See also

 Damiaatjes
 Caphutkia ancient name of Damietta in Aramaic & Jewish literature.
 Sheremsah
 Caphtor
 Damietta toad
 Domiati

References

External links 
 GCatholic - Latin titular see with incumbent biography links
 GCatholic - Melkite titular see with incumbent biography links

 
Governorate capitals in Egypt
Medieval cities of Egypt
Populated places in Damietta Governorate
Populated coastal places in Egypt
Crusade places
Nile Delta
Port cities of the Mediterranean Sea
Populated places established in the 6th century